Suryagandhi is a 1973 Indian Tamil-language film, directed by Muktha Srinivasan. It stars Jayalalithaa and Muthuraman, with Savithri, Cho Ramaswamy, Moulee, CID Shakuntala and Manorama in supporting roles. The film was digitised and re-released on 16 September 2016. The film was remade in Malayalam as Priyamvada, in Telugu as Moguda Pellama and in Kannada as Hennu Samsaradha Kannu. Kamal Haasan worked under Thangappan as his dance assistant in this movie.

Plot
Mohan is the eldest son in a middle-class family, having a superiority complex that he should be the first in everything. He and Radha fall in love and they get married. Mohan works in a low wage job despite being a graduate, which is insufficient for the family. So, Radha decides to join as a sales officer and starts working in a company. Her hard work earns her a good name and a promotion. So, her respect in the family rises as it improves the economic status of the family and she is able to fulfill the needs and wants of the family. Mohan is intolerant of Radha's respect growing, and he starts hating her.

Mohan's ego wants him to earn more than Radha and in the process he quits his job with the hope of finding a better one. Meantime, he also does modelling for liquor ads much against his family's wishes. Radha, with the help of her boss, recommends a high paying job for Mohan. But she does not inform this to Mohan as he might not take up the job if he knows that Radha was responsible for it. Mohan quits modelling after he gets the new job and mocks Radha, as he is paid more than her now. Mohan wants Radha to quit her job, but Radha does not agree to that.

Mohan's sister Suseela falls in love with a guy and becomes pregnant. Radha finds this out and arranges for the wedding to be as soon as possible, so that her pre-marital pregnancy is not known to others. Mohan misunderstands that Radha is overpowering him in family decisions and sends Radha out from his home and plans for a divorce. On the day of Suseela's marriage, the groom's father (M. R. R. Vasu) informs the truth to Mohan, which makes him realise his mistakes. Mohan understands that Radha preferred going to the job so that she can pay the dowry demanded by Suseela's in-laws. Mohan also finds out that his job was recommended with the help of Radha. Mohan transforms into a good man and decides to lead a happy life with Radha.

Cast
Muthuraman as Mohan
Jayalalitha as Radha 
 Cho Ramaswamy as Mahabali
 Manorama as Annam
 T. S. B. K. Moulee as Sama
 Major Sundararajan as Ekammbaram, Mohan's Father
 Savitri as Sivakami, Mohan's Mother
 M. R. R. Vasu as Sadhasivam Mudaliar (Colony owner)
 Gandhimathi as Kamakshi Sadhasivam Mudaliar's Wife
S. N. Parvathy as Parvathi, Radha's Mother
 Sasikumar as Sundaram, Sadhasivam Son
Senthamarai as Sriram
 Kathadi Ramamurthy as Ulagesan
A. Sakunthala as Usha, Mahabali's Wife
Kannadasan as Song's Player Role

Award
1973 'Tamil Nadu State Film Award
 won Tamil Nadu State Film Award for Best Actress - Jayalalithaa
Won Filmfare awards best actress—Tamil
Won Madras Filmfans Association Award for Best Actress.

Soundtrack
The music was composed by M. S. Viswanathan.

 Reception 
Kanthan of Kalki praised the story for being innovative, avoiding the path often taken by Tamil films.

Re-release
A digitally restored version of the film was released on 16 September 2016. Baradwaj Rangan of The Hindu'' compared it to "a YouTube video stretched over the big screen".

References

External links 
 

1970s Tamil-language films
1973 drama films
1973 films
Films directed by Muktha Srinivasan
Films scored by M. S. Viswanathan
Indian drama films
Tamil films remade in other languages